Tracy Brogan is a best-selling American author of historical romance and contemporary women's fiction, most known for her Bell Harbor series. Her novels have been translated into Japanese, German, and French, and her books have earned recognition and high praise from industry professionals and readers alike. Her next novel in the best-selling Bell Harbor series, Love Me Sweet, releases January 27, 2015.

Brogan is a native of Michigan and resides there with her family.

Awards and recognition 

CRAZY LITTLE THING (2012)
 #1 Amazon Bestseller's List in Contemporary Romance
 #15 Wall Street Journal
 Romance Writers of America RITA Award Finalist, Best First Book
 Golden Quill Award
 Booksellers Best Award

HIGHLAND SURRENDER (2012)
 #1 Amazon Bestseller's List Historical Romance
 Golden Quill Award

Bibliography

Contemporary/Women's fiction

Bell Harbor Series 

 Crazy Little Thing (2012)
 The Best Medicine (2014)
 Love Me Sweet (2015)

Standalone novels 

 Hold on My Heart (2013)

Historical romance 

 Highland Surrender

References

Novelists from Michigan
Year of birth missing (living people)
Living people
American women novelists
American romantic fiction novelists
Women romantic fiction writers
21st-century American novelists
21st-century American women writers